Mill Pond Park is a public park in the New York City borough of the Bronx. It was built to compensate for the loss of parkland resulting from the construction of new Yankee Stadium between 2006 and 2009. The park's name was inspired by a dam near the site of a creek that emptied into the Harlem River.

Site
Known to the Lenape Native Americans as Mentipathe, Cromwell Creek originated in Morris Heights and flowed south towards Harlem River. Mullally Park and Macombs Dam Park were created in the late 19th century by filling in Cromwell Creek. The old Yankee Stadium was completed on the filled stream in 1923.

On the Harlem River, landowner Robert Macomb built a dam in 1813 to harness the flow of the stream. Macomb's Dam enabled only small boats to pass through a lock. By 1838 residents along the riverbank questioned the private usurpation of the public waterway and a campaign to remove Macomb's Dam succeeded in its demolition in 1858. The unpopular barrier was replaced with Macombs Dam Bridge, which connects 161st Street in the Bronx with 155th Street in Manhattan.

On the site of Mill Pond Park, Mayor John F. Hylan proposed a wholesale market to concentrate all farm produce entering the Bronx at one location. The project was completed in 1935 during the administration of mayor Fiorello H. LaGuardia. Along the Harlem River, railroad barges brought produce to the market, docking between four piers that were later incorporated into the park. The Oak Point Link railroad line still runs along the western shore of the park.

Description
Mill Pond Park opened in 2009 and includes picnic and grass areas, an outdoor classroom, children's spray showers, a sand play area, two water channels, and a rehabilitated seawall. Mill Pond Park also includes 16 Deco Turf tennis courts that operate during the outdoor tennis season, from April through November. During the winter months, 12 courts are covered by a bubble. At the northern side of the park is the historic Power house, constructed in 1923 to provide refrigeration for Bronx Terminal Market. Retrofitted with a green rooftop, the energy efficient facility contains offices, public restrooms, indoor café, tennis clubhouse and locker room. The second floor of the power house will serve as the permanent home of the Bronx Children's Museum.

References

External links
 Parks Department website

Concourse, Bronx
Harlem River
Parks in the Bronx